Mayumi Wakamura (若村麻由美 Wakamura Mayumi, born on January 3, 1967, in Nerima, Tokyo) is a Japanese actress. She decided to be an actress at age sixteen when she saw a stage production by Tatsuya Nakadai's troupe. Later she joined his stage production to be an actress. She debuted in the six-month Asadora TV series Hassai Sensei in 1987 (produced by NHK) when she was 21 years old. After the show, she started appearing on other TV shows including several TV movies and series. In 1988 she was cast in a drama Kigakaikyo.

In February, 2004, she married Kanehiro Ono, the leader of the religious group Shakusonkai (釈尊会). She appeared in another Asadora Jun to Ai in 2012.

Filmography

Films
 Florence My Love (1991)
 Kozure Ōkami: Sono Chiisaki Te ni  (1993)
 Spellbound (1999) - Wada
 Genghis Khan: To the Ends of the Earth and Sea (2007) - Hoelun
 God's Puzzle (2008) - Saraka's mother
 Tenshi no Koi (2009) - Ayako Ozawa
 Night People (2013)
 Hitotsubu no Mugi (2019) - Ogino Ginko
 Mio's Cookbook (2020)
 What Happened to Our Nest Egg!? (2021)
 The Woman of S.R.I. the Movie (2021) - Satsuki Kazaoka

Television
 Hassai Sensei (1987) - Midori Saotome
 Gokenin Zankurō (1995) - Tsutakichi
 Shiroi Kyotō (2003) - Kyoko Zaizen
 Atsuhime (2008) - Kangyoin (Tsuneko Hashimoto)
 The Woman of S.R.I. (2008–20) - Satsuki Kazaoka
 Rebound (2011) - Ran Morinaka
 Jun to Ai (2012) - Taeko Machida
 Murder at Mt. Fuji (2012) - Yoshie Watsuji
 Hana Moyu (2015) - Mitsuru Mukunashi
 Shizumanu Taiyō (2016)
 Princess Jellyfish (2018) - Rina
 Hanbun, Aoi (2018)
 Ochoyan (2020–21) - Chidori Yamamura
 Shikatanakatta to Iute wa Ikan no desu (2021)
 Nakamura Nakazo: Shusse no Kizahashi (2021)
 Prism (2022)

Dubbing roles
Calista Flockhart
Pictures of Baby Jane Doe (Jane)
Ally McBeal (Ally McBeal)
Things You Can Tell Just by Looking at Her (Christine Taylor)
Bedtime Stories (Jill Hastings (Keri Russell))
Janice Beard (Janice Beard (Eileen Walsh))

Video games
Grandia III (Miranda)

Awards

References

External links

JMDb Profile 
Official Site 

1967 births
Asadora lead actors
People from Nerima
Living people
Actresses from Tokyo